The Department of Youth was a part of the Government of New Brunswick.  Originally named the Department of Youth and Welfare, it was charged with the planning and supervision of services for youth and administration of social welfare programs in New Brunswick. In 1968, functions related to social welfare were moved to the Department of Health and Welfare.

Ministers

References 
 List of ministers and deputy ministers by department, New Brunswick Legislative Library  (pdf)

Defunct New Brunswick government departments and agencies